The Copa Libertadores 1974 was the 15th edition of the Copa Libertadores, CONMEBOL's annual international club tournament. Independiente won the competition.

Group stage

Group 1 

First place play-off: Huracan won 4–0 over Rosario Central in Buenos Aires.

Group 2

Group 3

Group 4

Group 5

Semi-finals

Group 1

Group 2

Finals

Replay match at Estadio Nacional in Santiago, Chile.

External links
Match results at CONMEBOL's website (In Spanish)
In English
Match result at RSSSF's website

1
Copa Libertadores seasons